Anthony Molloy may refer to:

 Anthony Molloy (Gaelic footballer) (born 1962), former Donegal captain
 Anthony Molloy (lawyer) (born 1944), New Zealand author and lawyer
 Anthony James Pye Molloy (  1754–1814), Royal Navy officer